Daniel Mensah Kwei (born 22 February 1976) is a Ghanaian sprinter. He competed in the men's 4 × 400 metres relay at the 2000 Summer Olympics.

References

1976 births
Living people
Athletes (track and field) at the 2000 Summer Olympics
Ghanaian male sprinters
Olympic athletes of Ghana
Place of birth missing (living people)